Jonas Lindh (born 24 June 1982) is a former Swedish footballer who played as a midfielder.

References

External links
 
 

1982 births
Living people
Association football midfielders
Swedish footballers
Allsvenskan players
Superettan players
Landskrona BoIS players